Kravits, Kravitz, Kravit are Yiddish-language occupational surnames derived from the Ukrainian word кравець (see Kravets), "tailor". The surname may refer to:

Amy Kravitz, American film director
Andy Kravitz, American drummer
Asher Kravitz (born 1969), Israeli humorist, physicist and mathematician
Danny Kravitz (1930–2013), American baseball player
Dick Kravitz (born 1941), American politician
Edward Kravitz (born 1932), American neuroscientist
Jason Kravits (born 1967), American actor
Jean-Jacques Kravetz (born 1947), French keyboardist, saxophonist, and composer
Lee Kravitz, American journalist
Lenny Kravitz (born 1964), American musician
Leonard M. Kravitz, American soldier
Lou Kravitz, American labor racketeer
Mark R. Kravitz (1950–2012), American judge
Nina Kraviz (Nina Kravits), Russian DJ
Peter Kravitz, Scottish author and critic
Pinky Kravitz (1927–2015), American journalist
Ted Kravitz (born 1974), British presenter and reporter
Zoë Kravitz (born 1988), American singer and actress

Fictional characters

Duddy Kravitz, fictional character from the novel The Apprenticeship of Duddy Kravitz, by Mordecai Richler
Gladys Kravitz, fictional character from the TV series Bewitched

See also
 
 

Jewish surnames
Occupational surnames
Surnames of Ukrainian origin
Yiddish-language surnames